Dallas Jackson (born March 31, 1989) is a Canadian former professional ice hockey defenceman. He last played with Hudiksvalls HC of the Hockeyettan (Div.1).

Playing career
Jackson played major junior hockey in the Western Hockey League. On September 2, 2010, the Reading Royals of the ECHL signed Jackson to his first professional contract.

Jackson returned for his third season with the Gwinnett Gladiators of the ECHL to start the 2012–13 season. On December 29, 2012, he was signed to a try-out contract for a second stint with the Bridgeport Sound Tigers. After 11 games in Bridgeport, Jackson was extended and signed to his first AHL contract with the Sound Tigers for the remainder of the season on February 27, 2013.

In the 2013–14 season, Jackson posted 24 points in 53 games as a regular on the Sound Tigers defense before he was traded to the Springfield Falcons in exchange for Jeremy Langlois on March 12, 2014.

On September 11, 2014, the Greenville Road Warriors announced that they had signed Jackson to a one-year contract. In the 2014–15 season, Jackson appeared in 23 games with the Road Warriors before he was loaned to AHL affiliate, the Hartford Wolf Pack. Jackson was able to establish a role on the blueline with the Wolf Pack and was signed for the remainder of the season to feature in 44 games for 10 points.

As an un-signed free agent over the summer, Jackson signed his first contract abroad, agreeing a one-year deal in Sweden with Hockeyettan club, Hudiksvalls HC on August 4, 2015.

Career statistics

References

External links

1989 births
Living people
Bridgeport Sound Tigers players
Canadian expatriate ice hockey players in the United States
Canadian ice hockey defencemen
Greenville Road Warriors players
Gwinnett Gladiators players
Hartford Wolf Pack players
Ice hockey people from Alberta
Kelowna Rockets players
Lake Erie Monsters players
Olds Grizzlys players
People from Edson, Alberta
Prince George Cougars players
Reading Royals players
Red Deer Rebels players
Regina Pats players
Springfield Falcons players